Kozjak (u) is a village in the Resen Municipality of the Republic of North Macedonia. It has 117 residents.

Demographics
Kozjak is inhabited by a Turkish majority and a small number of Albanians. It is one of two villages with a Turkish majority, the other being Lavci.

Gallery

References

Villages in Resen Municipality